The Chemung Speedrome is a 3/8 mile asphalt race track in Chemung, New York, USA. Built in 1951 by the Bodine family (becoming the home track of Geoff Bodine, Brett Bodine and Todd Bodine), the track was first dirt-surfaced, then paved. It was closed in 1978. After buying the track in 1985, one of the current owners, Bob Stapleton, started to rebuild the track in 1997, and, in 2000, the track held its inaugural event.

Events held at the Speedrome
The track currently hosts: Whelen All-American Series, INEX Legends, Bandoleros, Race Of Champions Modified Tour.

Chemung Speedrome had hosted in the past: The NASCAR Whelen Modified Tour, the ISMA Super Modifieds, USAR Hooters Pro Cup Series, SST Modified Tour, Cup Lite Racing Series and USAC Ford Focus Midget Series.

Facilities
The Chemung Speedrome features all-new TV quality Musco Lighting, a 3000-seat main grandstand, a 28-stall paved pit lane and much more.

Friday Night Sister Speedway
Spencer Speedway - Williamson, New York

Track Operators
Owner: John White-Bob Stapleton
Race Director: Ray Hodge 
Office Managers: Kathy Grodski
Announcers: Carol Houssock
Tech Inspector: Chester Bennett
Scorers: Dale Campbell 
Head Flagger: Allen Mathews
Handicapper: 
Scoreboard: 
Concession Manager: 
Track Photographer: 
Track Videographer: Race Report Productions  www.TheRaceReport.TVPace Car Driver:''' Billy Griffin

External links
 Official Website
Chemung Speedrome race results at Racing-Reference

Motorsport venues in New York (state)
NASCAR tracks
Sports venues in Chemung County, New York
1951 establishments in New York (state)
Sports venues completed in 1951